Mun may refer to:

People
 Mun (Korean name), a Korean surname
 Mun Bhuridatta (1870–1949), Thai bhikkhu
 Thomas Mun (1571–1641) English writer on economics

Places 
 Mun, Hautes-Pyrénées, a commune in the Hautes-Pyrénées, France
 Mun River, Thailand
 River Mun, Norfolk, England

Organisations 
 Memorial University of Newfoundland
 Model United Nations 
 Manchester United, a professional football club
 National Unity Movement (Nicaragua), a political party in Nicaragua

Other uses
 Mun (album), album by Finnish musician Nopsajalka
 Mun (religion), a shamanistic religion of the Lepcha people
 Mün language, a language of Burma
 Mun (unit), a South Asian unit of mass
 Korean mun, a historical currency of Joseon Korea
 The player of a role-playing video game; see Mundane § In popular culture